The marine molluscs of Montenegro are a part of the molluscan fauna of Montenegro (wildlife of Montenegro).

A number of species of marine molluscs are found in the wild in Montenegro.

Summary table of number of species

There were recognized 354 marine species of molluscs in Montenegro in 2017.

Polyplacophorans

Chitonidae
 Chiton corallinus (Risso, 1826)
 Chiton olivaceus Spengler, 1797

Acanthochitonidae
 Acanthochitona fascicularis (Linnaeus, 1767)

Marine gastropods 

Patellidae
 Patella caerulea (Linnaeus, 1758)
 Patella rustica (Linnaeus, 1758)
 Patella vulgata (Linnaeus, 1758)

Fissurellidae
 Diodora gibberula (Lamarck, 1822)
 Diodora graeca (Linnaeus, 1758)
 Diodora italica (Defrance, 1820)
 Emarginula huzardii Payraudeau, 1826
 Emarginula fissura (Linnaeus, 1758)
 Emarginula octaviana Coen, 1939
 Puncturella noachina (Linnaeus, 1771)

Haliotidae
 Haliotis tuberculata Linnaeus, 1758

Trochidae
 Clanculus corallinus (Gmelin, 1791)
 Clanculus cruciatus (Linnaeus, 1758)
 Clelandella miliaris (Brocchi, 1814)
 Gibbula umbilicaris (Linnaeus, 1758)
 Gibbula adriatica (Philippi, 1844)
 Gibbula albida (Gmelin, 1791)
 Gibbula divaricata (Linnaeus, 1758)
 Gibbula drepanensis (Brugnone, 1873)
 Gibbula fanulum (Gmelin, 1791)
 Gibbula guttadauri (Philippi, 1836)
 Gibbula magus (Linnaeus, 1758)
 Gibbula philberti (Récluz, 1843)
 Gibbula rarilineata (Michaud, 1829)
 Gibbula varia (Linnaeus, 1758)
 Phorcus richardi (Payraudeau, 1826)
 Jujubinus exasperatus (Pennant, 1777)
 Jujubinus striatus (Linnaeus, 1758)
 Phorcus articulatus (Lamarck, 1822)
 Phorcus mutabilis (Philippi, 1846)
 Phorcus turbinatus (Born, 1778)

Calliostomatidae
 Calliostoma conulus (Linnaeus, 1758)
 Calliostoma laugieri (Payraudeau, 1826)
 Calliostoma zizyphinum (Linnaeus, 1758)

Turbinidae
 Bolma rugosa (Linnaeus, 1767)

Phasianellidae
 Tricolia pullus (Linnaeus, 1758)

Colloniidae
 Homalopoma sanguineum (Linnaeus, 1758)

Neritidae
 Smaragdia viridis (Linnaeus, 1758)

Cerithiidae
 Bittium latreillii (Payraudeau, 1826)
 Bittium reticulatum (da Costa, 1778)
 Bittium submamillatum (de Rayneval & Ponzi, 1854)
 Cerithium vulgatum Bruguière, 1792

Turritellidae
 Turritella communis (Risso, 1826)
 Turritella turbona (Monterosato, 1877)

Triphoridae
 Monophorus perversus (Linnaeus, 1758)
 Marshallora adversa (Montagu, 1803)
 Metaxia metaxa (Delle Chiaje, 1828)
 Strobiligera brychia (Bouchet & Guillemot, 1978)

Cerithiopsidae
 Cerithiopsis jeffreysi (Watson, 1885)

Epitoniidae
 Epitonium clathrus (Linnaeus, 1758)
 Epitonium muricatum (Risso, 1826)
 Epitonium turtonis (Turton, 1819)

Eulimidae
 Eulima glabra (da Costa, 1778)
 Melanella alba (da Costa, 1778)
 Melanella compactilis (Locard, 1892)

Littorinidae
 Melarhaphe neritoides (Linnaeus, 1758)

Rissoidae
 Alvania cancellata (da Costa, 1778)
 Alvania lineata (Risso, 1826)
 Alvania cimex (Linnaeus, 1758)
 Alvania cimicoides (Forbes, 1844)
 Alvania hispidula (Monterosato, 1884)
 Peringiella elegans (Locard, 1892)
 Pusillina marginata (Michaud, 1830)
 Rissoa guerinii (Récluz, 1843)
 Rissoa membranacea (Adams J., 1800)
 Rissoa monodonta (Philippi, 1836)
 Rissoa parva (da Costa, 1778)
 Rissoa splendida (Eichwald, 1830)
 Setia ambigua (Brugnone, 1873)

Caecidae
 Caecum trachea (Montagu, 1803)
 Parastrophia asturiana de Folin, 1870

Hydrobiidae
 Peringia ulvae (Pennant, 1777)

Iravadiidae
 Hyala vitrea (Montagu, 1803)

Tornidae
 Circulus striatus (Philippi, 1836)

Vermetidae
 Thylacodes arenarius (Linnaeus, 1758)
 Petaloconchus glomeratus (Linnaeus, 1758)

Aporrhaidae
 Aporrhais pespelecani (Linnaeus, 1758)

Calyptraeidae
 Calyptraea chinensis (Linnaeus, 1758)
 Crepidula moulinsii (Michaud, 1829)

Capulidae
 Capulus ungaricus (Linnaeus, 1758)

Triviidae
 Trivia multilirata (Sowerby, G. B. II, 1870)

Cypraeidae
Luria lurida (Linnaeus, 1758)
 Zonaria pyrum (Gmelin, 1791)
 Erosaria spurca (Linnaeus, 1758)

Ovulidae
 Pseudosimnia adriatica (Sowerby, G. B. II, 1870)

Naticidae
 Euspira macilenta (Philippi, 1844)
 Euspira nitida (Donovan, 1804)
 Natica hebraea (Martyn, 1786)
 Euspira catena (da Costa, 1778)
 Euspira intricata (Donovan, 1804)
 Notocochlis dillwynii (Payraudeau, 1826)
 Neverita josephinia (Risso, 1826)
 Natica stercusmuscarum (Gmelin, 1791)

Tonnidae
 Tonna galea (Linnaeus, 1758)

Ranellidae
 Cabestana cutacea (Linnaeus, 1767)

Cassidae
 Galeodea echinophora (Linnaeus, 1758)

Muricidae
 Bolinus brandaris (Linnaeus, 1758)
 Coralliophila squamosa (Bivona Ant. in Bivona And., 1838)
 Hexaplex trunculus (Linnaeus, 1758)
 Muricopsis cristata (Brocchi, 1814)
 Ocenebra erinaceus (Linnaeus, 1758)
 Stramonita haemastoma (Linnaeus, 1767)

Marginellidae
 Granulina marginata (Bivona Ant., 1832)

Costellariidae
 Vexillum tricolor (Gmelin, 1791)
 Vexillum luculentum (Reeve, 1845)
 Vexillum acuminatum (Gmelin, 1791)

Buccinidae
 Euthria cornea (Linnaeus, 1758)
 Pollia dorbignyi (Payraudeau, 1826)
 Pisania striata (Gmelin, 1791)

Nassariidae
 Cyclope neritea (Linnaeus, 1758)
 Nassarius corniculum (Olivi, 1792)
 Nassarius cuvierii (Payraudeau, 1826)
 Nassarius mutabilis (Linnaeus, 1758)
 Nassarius pygmaeus (Lamarck, 1822)
 Nassarius reticulatus (Linnaeus, 1758)
 Nassarius incrassatus (Strøm, 1768)

Columbellidae
 Columbella rustica (Linnaeus, 1758)
 Mitrella scripta (Linnaeus, 1758)

Fasciolariidae
 Fusinus pulchellus (Philippi, 1840)
 Fusinus rostratus (Olivi, 1792)
 Fusinus parvulus (Monterosato, 1884)
 Fusinus syracusanus (Linnaeus, 1758)
 Tarantinaea lignaria (Linnaeus, 1758)

Conidae
 Conus ventricosus Gmelin, 1791

Horaiclavidae
 Haedropleura septangularis (Montagu, 1803)

Mangeliidae
 Bela brachystoma (Philippi, 1844)
 Bela taprurensis (Pallary, 1904)
 Mangelia attenuata (Montagu, 1803)
 Mangelia costulata Risso, 1826
 Mangelia striolata Risso, 1826
 Mangelia scabrida Monterosato, 1890
 Mangelia stosiciana Brusina, 1869
 Mangelia unifasciata (Deshayes, 1835)

Raphitomidae
 Raphitoma aequalis (Jeffreys, 1867)
 Raphitoma philberti (Michaud, 1829)
 Raphitoma purpurea (Montagu, 1803)
 Raphitoma echinata (Brocchi, 1814)
 Raphitoma cordieri (Payraudeau, 1826)

Mathildidae
 Mathilda quadricarinata (Brocchi, 1814)

Pyramidellidae
 Eulimella acicula (Philippi, 1836)
 Eulimella scillae (Scacchi, 1835)
 Megastomia conoidea (Brocchi, 1814)
 Turbonilla delicata (Monterosato, 1874)
 Turbonilla gradata (Bucquoy, Dautzenberg & Dollfus, 1883)
 Turbonilla lactea (Linnaeus, 1758)
 Turbonilla pusilla (Philippi, 1844)

Acteonidae
 Acteon tornatilis (Linnaeus, 1758)

Ringiculidae
 Ringicula auriculata (Ménard de la Groye, 1811)
 Ringicula conformis (Monterosato, 1877)
 Ringicula gianninii Nordsieck, 1974

Bullidae
 Bulla striata (Bruguière, 1792)

Haminoeidae
 Haminoea hydatis (Linnaeus, 1758)
 Haminoea navicula (da Costa, 1778)
 Weinkauffia turgidula (Forbes, 1844)

Philinidae
 Philine quadripartita Ascanius, 1772
 Philine scabra (O. F. Müller, 1784)

Cylichnidae
 Cylichna cylindracea (Pennant, 1777)

Retusidae
 Volvulella acuminata (Bruguière, 1792)

Plakobranchidae
 Elysia timida (Risso, 1818)
 Thuridilla hopei (Vérany, 1853)

Umbraculidae
 Umbraculum umbraculum (Lightfoot, 1786)

Tylodinidae
 Tylodina perversa (Gmelin, 1791)

Akeridae
 Akera bullata O. F. Müller, 1776

Aplysiidae
 Aplysia depilans (Gmelin, 1791)
 Aplysia dactylomela (Rang, 1828)
 Aplysia fasciata Poiret, 1789
 Bursatella leachii de Blainville, 1817

Dorididae
 Doris bertheloti (d'Orbigny, 1839)

Discodorididae
 Atagema rugosa Pruvot-Fol, 1951
 Baptodoris cinnabarina Bergh, 1884
 Geitodoris portmanni (Schmekel, 1972)
 Discodoris erubescens Bergh 1884
 Platydoris argo (Linnaeus, 1767)
 Peltodoris atromaculata (Bergh, 1880)

Chromodorididae
 Felimare orsinii (Vérany, 1864)
 Felimare picta (Schultz in Philippi, 1836)
 Felimare tricolor (Cantraine, 1835)
 Felimida krohni (Vérany, 1846)
 Felimida luteorosea (Rapp, 1827)

Phyllidiidae
 Phyllidia flava (Aradas, 1847)

Dendrodorididae

 Doriopsilla areolata Bergh, 1880

Polyceridae
 Thecacera pennigera (Montagu, 1813)

Calycidorididae
 Diaphorodoris papillata Portmann & Sandmeier, 1960

Tritoniidae
 Tritonia nilsodhneri (Marcus Ev., 1983)

Tethydidae
 Melibe viridis Kelaart 1858
 Tethys fimbria Linnaeus, 1767

Proctonotidae
 Janolus cristatus (Delle Chiaje, 1841)

Facelinidae
 Cratena peregrina (Gmelin, 1791)
 Dicata odhneri (Schmekel, 1967)
 Dondice banyulensis Portmann & Sandmeier, 1960
 Facelina fusca Schmekel, 1966

Flabellinidae
 Flabellina affinis (Gmelin, 1791)
 Flabellina babai Schmekel, 1972
 Flabellina ischitana (Hirano & Thompson, 1990)
 Flabellina iodinea (J. G. Cooper, 1863)
 Flabellina pedata (Montagu, 1816)

Rissoellidae
 Rissoella diaphana (Alder, 1848)

Rissoinidae
 Rissoina bruguieri (Payraudeau, 1826)

Marine bivalves 
Nuculidae
 Nucula nitidosa (Winckworth, 1930)
 Nucula nucleus (Linnaeus, 1758)
 Nucula sulcata (Bronn, 1831)

Nuculanidae
 Nuculana pella (Linnaeus, 1767)
 Saccella commutata (Philippi, 1844)

Arcidae
 Acar gradata (Broderip & Sowerby, G. B. I 1829)
 Anadara polii (Mayer, 1868)
 Anadara transversa (Say, 1822)
 Arca noae (Linnaeus, 1758)
 Arca tetragona (Poli, 1795)
 Barbatia barbata (Linnaeus, 1758)

Noetiidae
 Striarca lactea (Linnaeus, 1758)

Glycymerididae
 Glycymeris glycymeris (Linnaeus, 1758)
 Glycymeris bimaculata (Poli, 1795)
 Glycymeris nummaria (Linnaeus, 1758)

Mytilidae
 Dacrydium vitreum (Møller, 1842)
 Modiolus barbatus (Linnaeus, 1758)
 Lithophaga lithophaga (Linnaeus, 1758)
 Musculus discors (Linnaeus, 1767)
 Mytilaster lineatus (Gmelin, 1791)
 Mytilaster minimus (Poli, 1795)
 Mytilus galloprovincialis (Lamarck, 1819)
 Mytilus edulis (Linnaeus, 1758)
 Arcuatula senhousia (Benson in Cantor, 1842)
 Gibbomodiola adriatica (Lamarck, 1819)

Pinnidae
 Pinna nobilis (Linnaeus, 1758)
 Atrina fragilis (Pennant, 1777)

Pteriidae
 Pteria hirundo (Linnaeus, 1758)

Pectinidae
 Aequipecten opercularis (Linnaeus, 1758)
 Manupecten pesfelis (Linnaeus, 1758)
 Flexopecten glaber (Linnaeus, 1758)
 Pecten jacobeus (Linnaeus, 1758)
 Pecten maximus (Linnaeus, 1758)
 Pseudamussium sulcatum (Müller O. F., 1776)
 Talochlamys multistriata (Poli, 1795)
 Mimachlamys varia (Linnaeus, 1758)

Spondylidae
 Spondylus gaederopus (Linnaeus, 1758)

Anomiidae
 Anomia ephippium (Linnaeus, 1758)
 Heteranomia squamula (Linnaeus, 1758)
 Monia patelliformis (Linnaeus, 1761)

Limidae
 Lima lima (Linnaeus, 1758)
 Limaria hians (Gmelin, 1791)

Ostreidae
 Ostrea edulis Linnaeus, 1758
 Ostrea stentina (Payraudeau, 1826)

Lucinidae
 Anodontia fragilis (Philippi, 1836)
 Ctena decussata (Costa O.G., 1829)
 Myrtea spinifera (Montagu, 1803)
 Loripes lucinalis (Lamarck, 1818)
 Lucinella divaricata (Linnaeus, 1758)
 Lucinoma borealis (Linnaeus, 1767)

Thyasiridae
 Thyasira flexuosa (Montagu, 1803)

Ungulinidae
 Diplodonta brocchii (Deshayes, 1850)
 Diplodonta rotundata (Montagu, 1803)

Chamidae
 Chama circinata (di Monterosato, 1878)
 Chama gryphoides (Linnaeus, 1758)

Lasaeidae
 Lepton squamosum (Montagu, 1803)

Montacutidae
 Kurtiella bidentata (Montagu, 1803)

Sportellidae
 Sportella recondita (Fischer P. in de Folin, 1872)

Cardiidae
 Acanthocardia echinata (Linnaeus, 1758)
 Acanthocardia deshayesii (Payraudeau, 1826)
 Acanthocardia paucicostata (Sowerby G. B. II, 1834)
 Acanthocardia tuberculata (Linnaeus, 1758)
 Cerastoderma glaucum (Bruguière, 1789)
 Laevicardium oblongum (Gmelin, 1791)
 Papillicardium papillosum (Poli, 1791)
 Parvicardium exiguum (Gmelin, 1791)
 Parvicardium minimum (Philippi, 1836)
 Parvicardium scabrum (Philippi, 1844)

Mactridae
 Mactra glauca (Born, 1778)
 Mactra stultorum (Linnaeus, 1758)
 Spisula subtruncata (da Costa, 1778)

Mesodesmatidae
 Donacilla cornea (Poli, 1791)

Tellinidae
 Arcopagia balaustina (Linnaeus, 1758)
 Arcopagia crassa (Pennant, 1777)
 Gastrana fragilis (Linnaeus, 1767)
 Tellina distorta Poli, 1791
 Tellina donacina Linnaeus, 1758
 Tellina pulchella (Lamarck, 1818)
 Tellina serrata (Brocchi, 1814)
 Tellina tenuis (da Costa, 1778)

Donacidae
 Donax semistriatus Poli, 1791
 Donax trunculus Linnaeus, 1758

Psammobiidae
 Gari fervensis (Gmelin, 1791)
 Gari depressa (Pennant, 1777)
 Gari tellinella (Lamarck, 1818)

Semelidae
 Abra alba (Wood. W., 1802)
 Abra nitida (Müller O. F., 1776)
 Abra prismatica (Montagu, 1808)
 Abra segmentum (Récluz, 1843)
 Scrobicularia cottardii (Payraudeau, 1826)
 Scrobicularia plana (da Costa, 1778)

Solecurtidae
 Azorinus chamasolen (da Costa, 1778)
 Solecurtus candidus (Brocchi, 1814)

Trapeziidae
 Coralliophaga lithophagella (Lamarck, 1819)

Glossidae
 Glossus humanus (Linnaeus, 1758)

Veneridae
 Callista chione (Linnaeus, 1758)
 Chamelea gallina (Linnaeus, 1758)
 Clausinella fasciata (da Costa, 1778)
 Dosinia lupinus (Linnaeus, 1758)
 Dosinia exoleta (Linnaeus, 1758)
 Gouldia minima (Montagu, 1803)
 Irus irus (Linnaeus, 1758)
 Mysia undata (Pennant, 1777)
 Petricola lithophaga (Retzius, 1788)
 Pitar rudis (Poli, 1795)
 Polititapes aureus (Gmelin, 1791)
 Ruditapes philippinarum (Adams & Reeve, 1850)
 Ruditapes decussatus (Linnaeus, 1758)
 Timoclea ovata (Pennant, 1777)
 Venus verrucosa Linnaeus, 1758
 Venus casina Linnaeus, 1758

Corbulidae
 Corbula gibba (Olivi, 1792)

Teredinidae
 Teredo navalis (Linnaeus, 1758)

Gastrochaenidae
 Gastrochaena dubia (Pennant, 1777)

Solenidae
 Solen marginatus (Pulteney, 1799)

Pharidae
 Ensis siliqua (Linnaeus, 1758)
 Ensis ensis (Linnaeus, 1758)
 Ensis minor (Chenu, 1843)
 Pharus legumen (Linnaeus, 1767)
 Phaxas pellucidus (Pennant, 1777)

Hiatellidae
 Hiatella arctica (Linnaeus, 1767)
 Hiatella rugosa (Linnaeus, 1767)
 Saxicavella jeffreysi (Winckworth, 1930)

Thraciidae
 Thracia corbuloidea de Blainville, 1827
 Thracia gracilis Jeffreys, 1865
 Thracia phaseolina (Lamarck, 1818)
 Thracia pubescens (Pulteney, 1799)

Pandoridae
 Pandora pinna (Montagu, 1803)

Poromyidae
 Poromya granulata (Nyst & Westendorp, 1839)

Cuspidariidae
 Cuspidaria cuspidata (Olivi, 1792)
 Cuspidaria rostrata (Spengler, 1793)

Scaphopods
Dentaliidae
 Antalis dentalis (Linnaeus, 1758)
 Antalis vulgaris (da Costa, 1778)
 Antalis inaequicostata (Dautzenberg, 1891)

Fustiariidae
 Fustiaria rubescens (Deshayes, 1825)

Gadilidae
 Dischides politus (S. Wood, 1842)

Cephalopods
Sepiidae
 Sepia elegans Blainville, 1827
 Sepia officinalis (Linnaeus, 1758)
 Sepia orbignyana (Férussac, 1826)

Sepiolidae
 Rossia macrosoma (Delle Chiaje, 1830)
 Sepietta oweniana (d'Orbigny, 1841)
 Sepiola rondeletii Leach, 1817

Loliginidae
 Alloteuthis media (Linnaeus, 1758)
 Loligo vulgaris (Lamarck, 1798)

Ommastrephidae
 Illex coindetii (Vérany, 1839)
 Todarodes sagittatus (Lamarck, 1798)

Octopodidae
 Eledone cirrhosa (Lamarck, 1798)
 Eledone moschata (Lamarck, 1798)
 Octopus salutii (Vérany, 1836)
 Octopus vulgaris (Cuvier, 1797)
 Pteroctopus tetracirrhus (Delle Chiaje, 1830)
 Scaeurgus unicirrhus (Delle Chiaje [in de Férussac & d'Orbigny], 1841)

Argonautidae
 Argonauta argo (Linnaeus, 1758)

See also
 List of non-marine molluscs of Montenegro

Lists of molluscs of surrounding countries:
 List of marine molluscs of Albania
 List of marine molluscs of Croatia
 List of marine molluscs of Bosnia and Herzegovina (quite close)
 List of marine molluscs of Italy (marine border)

References

Montenegro
Montenegro